Acer granatense, the Spanish maple, is a species of flowering plant in the genus Acer, native to Spain, including the Balearic islands, and Morocco. Considered by some authorities to be a subspecies of the Italian maple, Acer opalus subsp. granatense, it is often found growing on cliffs and crevices in mountainous areas.

References

granatense
Plants described in 1838